The  is a single-car electric multiple unit (EMU) train type operated by the Japanese private railway operator Hakone Tozan Railway on its steeply graded Hakone Tozan Line since 1 November 2014.

Overview
The fleet consists of two single-car units branded "Allegra". The general design of the trains was overseen by Noriaki Okabe Architecture Network, with the two vehicles on order costing a total of approximately 800 million yen.

Externally, the trains are finished in the standard Hakone Tozan Railway livery of "Vermillion Hakone" with silver highlights.

Interior
Passenger accommodation consists mostly of four-person seating bays, with a wheelchair space at the Gora end of the cars. Seating is provided for 36 passengers, including five pairs of tip-up seats near the doorways. Total capacity is 75, including standing passengers. The trains use LED lighting throughout.

History
The first unit was delivered from Kawasaki Heavy Industries in Kobe in April 2014, with the second unit delivered in August.

In May 2015, the 3000 series was awarded the 2015 Laurel Prize, presented annually by the Japan Railfan Club. A presentation ceremony was held at Gora Station on 8 November 2015.

Two new units, 3003 and 3004, were delivered in May 2019.

References

External links

  

Electric multiple units of Japan
3000
Train-related introductions in 2014
750 V DC multiple units
1500 V DC multiple units of Japan
Kawasaki multiple units